Christo Hall (born in 1978, in Sydney, Australia) is an entrepreneur, ex-professional surfer, author and owner of a marketing agency.

Early years 

Christo Hall was born in 1978 on the Northern Beaches of Sydney. He spent his childhood surfing and followed his childhood dream to become a professional surfer and featured in Surfing World Magazine Best Surfers of all Time Edition 2009. At age 14 he got his first surfboard sponsor Simon Anderson.

Career 

In 1991 Hall got sponsored by Billabong and was one of their team riders for 15 years.
Christo is a surfer for North Narrabeen Board Riders club and has surf for the team to win 4 Australian titles  Global Surf Tag News 05.02.2011 North Narrabeen National Surfing Reserve Book page 29 and featured in The Surfing Year Book.

In 2004 Christo retired from full-time international competition. Still had a 49th place on the surfing World Qualifying Series in 2008 and went into business  producing beginner surfboards - Softboards Australia. He bought and sold a few other businesses in the surfing industry and in 2009 started Basic Bananas.

Christo has been featured across the Australian media landscape including The Sydney Morning Herald, The Age, SmartCompany, BRW, Channel 9 in relation to marketing.

In 2012 Hall published his first book Bananas About Marketing.

Besides running different businesses, Christo is also a keynote speaker on the topic of  marketing and entrepreneurship.

Personal life 

Hall lives in Narrabeen on Sydney's Northern Beaches

References 

Australian businesspeople
Living people
1978 births
Australian surfers
Sportsmen from New South Wales
Sportspeople from Sydney